Lau Wai Shing (born 29 July 1955 in Hong Kong), also known as Wai Shing Lau or Michael Lau, is a Hong Kong electrical engineer and materials scientist. He worked on both Si-based and III-V based microelectronics.

Biography
Lau was born in Hong Kong in 1955.

Lau served as lecturer and then senior lecturer in the National University of Singapore from 1988 to 1997. He worked in Chartered Semiconductor from 1997 to 2000. He then became an associate professor in the Nanyang Technological University from 2001 to 2009. Subsequently, he has essentially retired.

Lau Wai Shing is quite a common name. For example, there is another person with the name of Michael Wai Shing Lau, who is a Senior Lecturer working for Newcastle University at Nanyang Polytechnic and has published extensively.

References

 

1955 births
Living people
Chinese electrical engineers
Chinese materials scientists
Hong Kong engineers
Academic staff of the National University of Singapore
Penn State College of Engineering alumni
Alumni of the University of Hong Kong